Roger Bart (born September 29, 1962) is an American actor and singer. He won a Tony Award and a Drama Desk Award for his performance as Snoopy in the 1999 revival of You're a Good Man, Charlie Brown.

Bart received his second Tony Award nomination for playing Carmen Ghia in the original production of The Producers. His other accolades include a SAG Award and three Outer Critics Circle Award nominations.

Bart performed the song "Go the Distance" from the 1997 animated film Hercules, which was nominated for an Oscar and a Golden Globe.

Early life and education
Bart was born in Norwalk, Connecticut, the son of a teacher and a chemical engineer, and grew up in Bernardsville, New Jersey. His uncle is journalist Peter Bart. He graduated from Bernards High School in 1980 and was inducted into the school's hall of fame.

He earned his BFA in Acting from Mason Gross School of the Arts at Rutgers, the State University of New Jersey in 1985.

Bart was close friends with Jonathan Larson: both worked as waiters between theater jobs and frequently hung out at each other's workplaces. He participated in early presentations of Larson's work including Tick, Tick... Boom! and Rent: the main character "Roger" from Rent is named after him.

Career
He made his Broadway debut in Big River as Tom Sawyer in 1985. Additional theatre credits include Jonathan in the Alan Menken/Tim Rice musical King David, Harlequin in Triumph of Love, Snoopy in the Broadway revival of You're a Good Man, Charlie Brown (for which he won the Drama Desk Award and a Tony), Carmen Ghia and later Leo Bloom in The Producers (earning Drama Desk and Tony nominations), and The Frogs at Lincoln Center, which reunited him with fellow Producers star Nathan Lane and Susan Stroman.

In 1996 and 1997, Bart appeared as Bud Frump in the USA national tour of How to Succeed in Business Without Really Trying.

On television, Bart played George Carlin's son on The George Carlin Show (1994), and on Bram and Alice (2002) he portrayed Bram's assistant, Paul Newman. He became widely known to viewers with his portrayal of George Williams, the unhinged homicidal pharmacist in love with Bree Van de Kamp (Marcia Cross), on Desperate Housewives, which earned him a SAG Award.

Bart provided the singing voice for teenage Hercules in Disney's Hercules, as well as the singing voice of Scamp in Lady and the Tramp II: Scamp's Adventure. He was featured in the 2004 remake of The Stepford Wives with Nicole Kidman, Matthew Broderick, Bette Midler, Christopher Walken and Glenn Close, and in The Producers (2005), in which he reprised his role of "common-law assistant" Carmen Ghia.

In December 2006, Bart played Howard "The Weasel" Montague in the Sci Fi Channel miniseries The Lost Room. In June 2007, he starred as Stuart in Hostel: Part II, the sequel to 2005's Hostel. In 2007 he had supporting roles in American Gangster and Spy School. In 2008, he appeared in Harold & Kumar Escape from Guantanamo Bay, the sequel to 2004's Harold & Kumar Go to White Castle, and Midnight Meat Train.

Bart also originated the lead role of Dr. Frederick Frankenstein in the musical adaptation of Mel Brooks' Young Frankenstein, which opened on Broadway in November 2007, following a run in Seattle. He reprised the role alongside former Broadway co-stars Shuler Hensley and Cory English in the United States national tour that launched in September 2009. He ended his run on August 8, 2010, and was succeeded by Christopher Ryan. Bart originally portrayed the role of Igor in the original workshop read-through.

Brad Oscar and Bart reprised their roles as Max Bialystock and Leo Bloom, respectively, in a production of The Producers at Starlight Theatre in Kansas City, Missouri. The show ran from August 23–29, 2010.

In 2011, Bart was cast in the recurring role of Mason Treadwell on the ABC drama series Revenge.

In 2013, Bart was cast in the recurring role of Roger Riskin on the Showtime drama series Episodes.

Bart was originally set to play the dual role of Charles Frohman and Captain James Hook in the 2014 A.R.T. pre-Broadway production of Finding Neverland. He was ultimately replaced by Michael McGrath.

In 2016, Bart returned to Broadway in the musical Disaster!

In 2017, Bart was cast in the recurring role of Vice Principal Nero on the second season of the Netflix comedy drama series A Series of Unfortunate Events.

In 2018, Bart was cast in the main role of Judge Wilson on the Freeform drama series Good Trouble, the spin-off of The Fosters.

In 2019, Bart was cast as Hades in the world premiere of Disney's musical, Hercules. That same year, he was announced to play Dr. Emmett Brown in the musical adaptation of Back to the Future. He was not able to perform in the musical's opening night in the West End after testing positive for COVID-19.

In 2021, Bart cameoed in the film adaptation of Tick, Tick... Boom!, 30 years after performing in the original show with Jonathan Larson. A character in the film played by Joshua Henry is named "Roger" after him, and is loosely inspired by Bart.

Filmography

Film

Television

Theatre

Awards and nominations

References

External links

Roger Bart and Brad Oscar  – Downstage Center interview at American Theatre Wing.org
Roger Bart Discusses Producers and "Housewives" at Playbill

1962 births
20th-century American male actors
21st-century American male actors
20th-century American singers
20th-century American male singers
21st-century American male singers
21st-century American singers
Living people
Jewish American male actors
Jewish singers
Actors from Norwalk, Connecticut
Male actors from Connecticut
Male actors from New Jersey
American male film actors
American male musical theatre actors
American male television actors
Drama Desk Award winners
Mason Gross School of the Arts alumni
Bernards High School alumni
People from Bernardsville, New Jersey
American people of Austrian-Jewish descent
Tony Award winners
American male pop singers
21st-century American Jews